The March 1875 Southeast tornado outbreak was a deadly tornado outbreak that affected portions of the Southern United States from March 19 to 20, 1875. At least nineteen tornadoes were recorded, including seven that were destructive enough to be rated F4 by Thomas P. Grazulis. The worst damage and most of the deaths occurred in Georgia. In all, this outbreak killed at least 96 people and injured at least 367.

List of tornadoes
The ratings for these tornadoes were done by tornado expert Thomas P. Grazulis and are not official ratings.

Note: Some of the events listed as individual tornadoes were probably tornado families.

Sparta, Georgia/Edgefield, South Carolina

The  tornado caused its first damage northwest of Sparta, Georgia in Hancock County after which it destroyed dozens of farms. Four people were killed in Hancock county, three of them on one farm. At least six people died in Warren County, including one at a church west of Warrentown. The pastor attributed the survival of the majority in the church to the pews, which stopped some of the falling timbers. The tornado then moved through Camak, where 39 of the town's 40 homes  were damaged or destroyed. At least seven people, possibly as many as nine, were killed in McDuffie County, most of them in small cabins. The death toll in Columbia County may have been as high as 20, though only eight deaths were confirmed. At least four people died in Appling, and as many as eight may have died on a plantation. The tornado then crossed the state line into Edgefield County, South Carolina where damage was less severe. Here, six farms and plantations were destroyed with three fatalities. The tornado finally dissipated south of Edgefield. The death toll from this tornado is listed at 28, but due to uncertainties, it may have been as high as 42.

See also
List of North American tornadoes and tornado outbreaks
Tornado intensity and damage
Tornado outbreak of March 3, 2019 – Produced a violent tornado that affected Talbotton, Georgia

Notes

References

Bibliography

F4 tornadoes by date
Southeast,1875-03-19
Tornadoes of 1875
Tornadoes in Georgia (U.S. state)
Tornadoes in South Carolina
Tornadoes in North Carolina
Tornadoes in Alabama
Tornadoes in Louisiana
1875 natural disasters in the United States
1875 in Georgia (U.S. state)
1875 in North Carolina
1875 in Louisiana
March 1875 events